Fourier Island is a small rocky island  off the coast and  east-northeast of Cape Mousse, Antarctica. It was charted in 1951 by the French Antarctic Expedition and named by them for Jean-Baptiste Fourier, the French geometrician.

See also 
 List of Antarctic and sub-Antarctic islands

References 

Islands of Adélie Land